Gerhardus Marthinus (Gert or Gerrit) Maritz (1 March 1797 – 23 September 1838), was a Voortrekker pioneer and leader, wagon builder.

Gerrit Maritz was the son of Salamo Stefanus Maritz and Maria Elizabeth Oosthuizen. He married Agnita Maria Olivier and later Anna Carolina Agatha van Rooyen and from them he fathered six children.

See also
Graaff-Reinet: Gerrit Maritz, Great Trek Leader after whom Pietermaritzburg was partly named was a wagon-maker in the town.
Pietermaritzburg: There exist two interpretations about the origin of the city's name. One is that it was named after Piet Retief and Gerrit Maritz, two famous Voortrekker leaders.

References

Sources

Further reading
Kuschke, Jazz (2006) The wagon maker with Woema - tracking Gerrit Maritz' life story, Getaway.co.za, 1 September 2006.

1798 births
1838 deaths
People from the Eastern Cape
Afrikaner people
South African people of Dutch descent
Great Trek
History of KwaZulu-Natal